Glass flakes are extremely thin glass plates with an average thickness of 5 ± 2 micrometers.

Manufacture 
There are two main methods to manufacture glass flakes. The first is the "bubble method", where a glass marble is turned into liquid and then blown into a bubble. It is then smashed into glass flakes and sieved by particle-size distribution. The second method is the "centrifuge method", in which high-temperature liquid glass in a rotating tub creates glass flakes due to the centrifugal force.

Application 
Glass flakes can be applied in anti-corrosive coatings, paints and pigments to prevent corrosion. Glass flakes can also be used as a reinforcement material in the manufacture of composite materials.

Glassflakes or glass flake particles form dense, inert barriers within the paint film. Overlapping layers of glass resist water and chemicals permeating the paint film. The addition of glass also increases the flexibility, hardness and abrasion resistance of coatings.

Classification 
The glass flake could be classified by the particle-size distribution of diameter

Surface treatment 
Glass flakes may be surface treated by silane coupline agents for better coupling with resin which is a main material of anti-corrosion coating. silane coupline agents include KH-570, KH-560, KH-550, A-174, Z-603, KBM-503, GF-31. Glass flakes with surface treated include C-90E, C-150V and RCF-160T.

References 

Glass